The following is a list of films with the most weekends as number one at the box office in the United States and Canada.

Films with at least four weekends at number one are listed. They must have been released in 1982 or later to qualify. This limit is in the Box Office Mojo source. On Golden Pond is included with a wide release in 1982 after a limited release in December 1981.

Ties are broken by total domestic box office without adjusting for inflation. E.T. sits atop with 16 weeks at number one (31% of a year). The largest number of films in a year is six in 1986 and 1992.

Six franchises have multiple films on the list:
 Marvel Cinematic Universe: Guardians of the Galaxy (2014), Black Panther (2018), Shang-Chi and the Legend of the Ten Rings (2021), Spider-Man: No Way Home (2021), and Black Panther: Wakanda Forever (2022)
 Avatar: Avatar (2009) and Avatar: The Way of Water (2022)
 Middle-earth: The Fellowship of the Ring (2001) and The Return of the King (2003)
 Police Academy: Police Academy (1984) and Police Academy 2: Their First Assignment (1985)
 Star Wars: Return of the Jedi (1983) and The Force Awakens (2015)
 The Hunger Games: The Hunger Games (2012) and The Hunger Games: Mockingjay – Part 2 (2015)

See also
 Lists of box office number-one films
 List of highest-grossing films in the United States and Canada

References 

Weekends at number one
Weekends at number one